Dr Georges Wohlfart (13 July 1950 – 13 February 2013) was a Luxembourgian politician.

Wohlfart was born in 1950 in Helmdange. A member of the Luxembourg Socialist Workers' Party, he served in consecutive cabinets, under Jacques Santer and Jean-Claude Juncker, from 1989 until 1999, holding positions including Minister of Health (1998–1999) and Trade Minister.

References

1950 births
2013 deaths
Government ministers of Luxembourg
Members of the Chamber of Deputies (Luxembourg)
Members of the Chamber of Deputies (Luxembourg) from Nord
Luxembourg Socialist Workers' Party politicians
Luxembourgian physicians
University of Liège alumni
People from Lorentzweiler